John III of Nuremberg (c. 1369 – 11 June 1420 in Plassenburg), Margrave of Brandenburg-Kulmbach from the House of Hohenzollern. He was elder son of Frederick V of Nuremberg and Elisabeth of Meissen.

Family and children
He was married c. 1381 Margaret of Luxemburg, daughter of Charles IV, Holy Roman Emperor and Elizabeth of Pomerania. They had only daughter, Elisabeth (1391–1429), who married Eberhard III, Count of Württemberg.

Hohenzollern, John III of Nuremberg
Hohenzollern, John III of Nuremberg
Burgraves of Nuremberg
Burials at Heilsbronn Abbey
Christians of the Battle of Nicopolis